Costinel is a Romanian male given name. Notable people with the name include:

Costinel Gugu (born 1992), Romanian footballer
Costinel Tofan (born 1996), Romanian footballer

Romanian masculine given names